John Lowin (baptized 9 December 1576 – buried – 24 August 1653) was an English actor.

Early life
Born in St Giles-without-Cripplegate, London, Lowin was the son of a tanner. Like Robert Armin, he was apprenticed to a goldsmith. While he is not recorded as a free citizen of this company, he did perform as a goldsmith, Leofstane, in a 1611 city pageant written by Anthony Munday. This pageant was commissioned by the Goldsmiths' Company in honor of the election of one of their company as mayor; in the document employing him, Lowin is described as a "brother" of the company, suggesting some form of ongoing relationship with that community. He lived in Southwark, where parish registers record two marriages involving a man of his name (in 1607 and 1620); the latter definitely involved the actor.

Career
Lowin was definitely associated with the theatrical world by 1602.  His name frequently occurs in the account books of Philip Henslowe in 1602, when he was playing with Worcester's Men at Rose Theatre in Bankside; a note in Henslowe's book places him in a travelling company in the same year. By late 1603, he had joined the new King's Men, apparently as a hired man rather than a sharer, as his name is not mentioned in the original royal patent. He probably became a sharer in 1604, when the total number of sharers was likely increased to twelve.

That he became important to the company fairly quickly is suggested by his appearance as himself (alongside Richard Burbage and Henry Condell) in the induction to John Marston's The Malcontent. He is mentioned in the surviving cast lists of the company's productions of Ben Jonson's Sejanus (1603), Volpone (1605), The Alchemist (1610), and Catiline (1611), John Fletcher's Bonduca and Valentinian (both ca. 1613), and John Webster's The Duchess of Malfi (ca. 1614).

Lowin's prowess as an actor is displayed by a remarkable fact about the plays in which he acted. In the hundreds of plays, and the thousands of roles in them, that date to the 1580–1610 era, there are only about twenty roles of 800 lines or longer. Only three plays have two roles of this scale: Shakespeare's Othello and Jonson's Volpone and The Alchemist. Burbage played the starring role in the King's Men's productions of these plays—;and Lowin apparently was the man who seconded him (just as Lowin is known to have played Bosola to Burbage's Ferdinand in The Duchess of Malfi). In all likelihood it was Lowin who played Iago to Burbage's Othello, Mosca to his Volpone, and Subtle to his Face.

Edward Alleyn's diary speaks of his dining with Lowin in 1620. When John Heminges died in 1630, Lowin purchased an eighth of the total shares in the Globe and Blackfriars Theatres. Together with Cuthbert Burbage, Richard Robinson and Winifred (d.1642), his wife, William Heminges, and Joseph Taylor, Lowin filed a Bill of Complaint on 28 January 1632 in the Court of Requests against the owner of the Globe, Sir Matthew Brend, in order to obtain confirmation of an extension of the 31-year lease originally granted by Sir Matthew Brend's father, Nicholas Brend.

With the death of Heminges in 1630, the old guard left over from the Lord Chamberlain's Men had finally passed. From that year until the theaters closed in 1642, Lowin (together with Joseph Taylor) assumed the roles previously fulfilled by Heminges, serving as treasurers and as contacts with the court and with the Master of the Revels. In 1633, he was scolded by Sir Henry Herbert for staging Fletcher's The Woman's Prize without censorship. After the theaters closed in 1642, Lowin may have kept an inn (called the Three Pigeons) at Brentford, where he died in 1659, at the age of eighty-two.

Lowin was one of the ten King's Men who signed the dedication in the 1647 Beaumont and Fletcher First Folio; also, he signed the 1652 edition of Fletcher's The Wild Goose Chase with Joseph Taylor. In the 25 cast lists added to plays in the second Beaumont and Fletcher folio of 1679, Lowin's name is mentioned in the lists for 21 dramas, more than any other single actor:

 Bonduca
 The Custom of the Country
 The Double Marriage
 The False One
 The Humorous Lieutenant
 The Island Princess
 The Knight of Malta
 The Laws of Candy
 The Little French Lawyer
 The Loyal Subject
 The Lovers' Progress

 The Mad Lover
 The Maid in the Mill
 The Pilgrim
 The Prophetess
 The Queen of Corinth
 The Sea Voyage
 The Spanish Curate
 Valentinian
 The Wild Goose Chase
 Women Pleased

Lowin, whose portrait in the Ashmolean Museum reveals as a large and imposing figure, is often associated with comic characters, especially those of a "stout blunt humor," including Falstaff and Melantius in Beaumont and Fletcher's The Maid's Tragedy. On the authority of James Wright's Historia Histrionica (1699), he is also associated with Jonson's Epicure Mammon (The Alchemist), Morose (Epicoene), and the title role in Volpone. Again on Wright's report, Lowin is supposed to have originated the role of Bosola in The Duchess of Malfi, and he was probably also the original Flaminius in Philip Massinger's Believe as You List. Finally, in Roscius Anglicanus, John Downes reports that Lowin originated the title role in Shakespeare and Fletcher's Henry VIII.

Legacy
Lowin was the author of a single literary work (as far as is known), a brief pamphlet titled Conclusions upon Dances that was first printed in 1607. The text of the pamphlet cites positive and negative examples of dances mentioned in the Bible.

Notes

References

Collier, J. P. Lives of the Original Actors in Shakespeare's Plays. London: Shakespeare Society, 1853.
Bawcutt, N. W. The Control and Censorship of Caroline Drama: The Records of Sir Henry Herbert, Master of the Revels, 1623-1673. Oxford: Oxford University Press, 1996.
Gurr, Andrew. The Shakespeare Company, 1594–1642. Cambridge, Cambridge University Press, 2004.
Halliday, F. E. A Shakespeare Companion 1564-1964. Baltimore, Penguin, 1964.
McMillin, Scott. Elizabethan Theatre and "The Book of Sir Thomas More." Ithaca, N.Y., Cornell University Press, 1987.
Nunzeger, Edwin. A Dictionary of Actors and of Other Persons Associated With the Public Presentation of Plays in England Before 1642. New Haven: Yale University Press, 1929.
Attribution
 

English male stage actors
1576 births
1659 deaths
Male actors from London
16th-century English male actors
17th-century English male actors